The 2016–17 season is the 30th season of competitive football played by DSK Shivajians. The club will play their second season in the I-League and Federation Cup.

Background

Transfers

In

Loan in

References

DSK Shivajians FC seasons